Magnolia Grove Monastery is a Buddhist monastery in the Plum Village Tradition in Batesville, Mississippi. The  grounds are located  near Memphis, Tennessee. In October 2005 Thích Nhất Hạnh officially accepted the monastery. They are closely in touch with the Plum Village Monastery for resources and support. Magnolia Grove Monastery is one of the three monasteries in the United States which are under the spiritual guidance of Thích Nhất Hạnh. The other two are Blue Cliff Monastery in New York and Deer Park Monastery in California. According to Magnolia Grove Monastery's website, "Magnolia Grove Monastery is a residential monastery and is simultaneously, Magnolia Village, a Mindfulness Practice Meditation Center in the tradition of Plum Village, founded by Zen Master Thich Nhat Hanh".

Twice weekly, on Thursdays and Sundays, public Days of Mindfulness are held, as well as regular retreats and special events.

See also
Thích Nhất Hạnh
Order of Interbeing
Buddhism in the United States
Buddhist Monasticism

References

External links 
 Plum Village - Thich Nhat Hanh's main monastery and practice center, located about 85 km east of Bordeaux, France.
Deer Park Monastery - located in Escondido, California.
Blue Cliff Monastery - located in Pine Bush, New York.
Magnolia Grove Monastery - located in Batesville, Mississippi.
I Am Home - Community of Mindful Living;  home of the "Mindfulness Bell" magazine with news, articles, and talks by Thich Nhat Hanh and other Order of Interbeing members.

Plum Village Tradition
Buddhist monasteries in the United States
Zen Buddhist monasteries
Buddhism in the United States
Buildings and structures in Panola County, Mississippi
Religious buildings and structures in Mississippi